The 1917–18 Kansas Jayhawks men's basketball team represented the University of Kansas during the 1917–18 college men's basketball season.

Roster
John Bunn
James Knoles
Arthur Lonborg
Frank Mandeville
Kelsey Mathews
Howard Miller
Carl Rice
Rudolf Uhrlaub

Schedule and results

References

Kansas
Kansas Jayhawks men's basketball seasons
Kansas Jayhawks Men's Basketball Team
Kansas Jayhawks Men's Basketball Team